The Canton of Albertville-Sud is a French former administrative subdivision, situated in the Savoie département and the Rhône-Alpes région. It was created in 1973. It was disbanded following the French canton reorganisation which came into effect in March 2015. In 2012, the population was 19,641.

The Canton of Albertville-Sud consisted of the following communes:

 Albertville (partly)
 Cevins
 Esserts-Blay
 Gilly-sur-Isère
 Grignon
 La Bâthie
 Monthion
 Rognaix
 Saint-Paul-sur-Isère
 Tours-en-Savoie

References 

Albertville-Sud
2015 disestablishments in France
States and territories disestablished in 2015